Blunt force trauma or blunt trauma is a medical term referring to a type of physical trauma.

Blunt Force Trauma may also refer to:
 Blunt Force Trauma (film), a 2015 Colombian English-language film
 Blunt Force Trauma (band), an American hardcore punk/thrash metal band from Austin, Texas
 Blunt Force Trauma (album), a 2011 album by Cavalera Conspiracy
 "Blunt Force Trauma", a song on the 2004 album New Found Power by Damageplan